Generalized Timing Formula is a standard by VESA which defines exact parameters of the component video signal for analogue VGA display interface.

The video parameters defined by the standard include horizontal blanking (retrace) and vertical blanking intervals, horizontal frequency and vertical frequency (collectively, pixel clock rate or video signal bandwidth), and horizontal/vertical sync polarity. Unlike predefined discrete modes (VESA DMT), any mode in a range can be produced using a formula by GTF.

A GTF-compliant display is expected to calculate the blanking intervals from the signal frequencies, producing a properly centered image. At the same time, a compliant graphics card is expected to use the calculation to produce a signal that will work on the display — either a GTF default formula for then-ordinary CRT displays or via a custom formula provided via EDID signaling.

These parameters are used by the XFree86 Modeline, for example. 

This video timing standard is available for free.

History 
The standard was adopted in 1999, and was superseded by the Coordinated Video Timings specification in 2002.

See also 
 Similar standards
 Coordinated Video Timings
 Extended display identification data, as it can interact with the video card with respect to providing information on permissible timings.
 Standards organizations
 VESA

References

External links
 The GTF Standard (free of charge) provides formulas and the companion spreadsheet contains GTF calculations. See Standards FAQ - VESA and Free Standards - VESA - Interface Standards for The Display Industry

Video signal
Audiovisual introductions in 1999
2002 disestablishments